Michael Taronites was a Byzantine aristocrat and brother-in-law of Emperor Alexios I Komnenos. He was involved in a conspiracy against him and was banished in 1094.

Biography
Michael belonged to the aristocratic family of the Taronitai, a princely clan of Armenian origin from Taron. His father, the patrikios Gregory Taronites, had been involved in a conspiracy against the megas domestikos Constantine, brother of Emperor Michael IV the Paphlagonian.

In  he married Maria Komnene, the oldest daughter of the megas domestikos John Komnenos and Anna Dalassene, and sister of the future emperor Alexios I Komnenos. In 1070, Michael accompanied his brother-in-law, Manuel Komnenos, on campaign against the Seljuk Turks, and was taken prisoner with him and Nikephoros Melissenos by a Turkish warband. However, Manuel soon persuaded the Turkish leader, Chrysoskoulos, to enter Byzantine service, and the three were set free. His career until the rise to the throne of Alexios I in 1081 is otherwise unknown.

As emperor, Alexios swiftly promoted Michael to the highest court dignities: Michael was named protosebastos and protovestiarios, before receiving the newly created title of panhypersebastos, which placed him on par with the Caesar Nikephoros Melissenos. Despite these high honours, he became involved in the conspiracy of Nikephoros Diogenes, the son and briefly co-emperor of Romanos IV Diogenes. The conspiracy was discovered in June 1094, and its leaders, Diogenes, Michael Taronites, and Katakalon Kekaumenos, were banished and their properties confiscated. The other conspirators were soon after blinded, but Taronites escaped this fate due to the intervention of his wife. His fate after that is unknown, as is that of Maria Komnene; she may have become a nun with the monastic name Anna. Both were certainly dead by 1136.

The couple had two sons, and possibly a daughter,  who may have been named Anna, but is otherwise unknown. The sons were:
 John Taronites (born ), who served as provincial governor and commander, he suppressed the revolt of his cousin Gregory Taronites. 
 Gregory Taronites (born ), protovestiarios and chief minister during the early reign of John II Komnenos.

References

Sources 
 
 
 

11th-century births
11th-century Byzantine people
Byzantine prisoners of war
Byzantine rebels
Family of Alexios I Komnenos
Michael
Year of death unknown
Byzantine people of the Byzantine–Seljuk wars
Protovestiarioi
Komnenos dynasty
Panhypersebastoi
Protosebastoi